England was represented at the 2010 Commonwealth Games by Commonwealth Games England. The country went by the abbreviation ENG, will use the Cross of St George as its flag and "Jerusalem" as its victory anthem. It had previously used "Land of Hope and Glory" as its anthem at the Commonwealth Games, but decided to change following an "internet poll".

England's delegation is notable for including two Paralympic champions, who qualified to compete in Delhi against fully able-bodied athletes: Danielle Brown, who won a gold medal in archery at the 2008 Summer Paralympics, and Sarah Storey, who won two gold medals in cycling in 2008. They are the first English athletes with disabilities ever to compete in able-bodied events at the Commonwealth Games.

England 2010

Key
 Qualifiers / Medal Winners
 Top 8 Finish (Non Medal Winners)
 Non-Qualifiers / Non Top 8 Finish

Badminton

Team England consists of 10 badminton players over 6 events. The competition draw for singles and doubles events was announced on 2 October 2010.

Men's Singles

Women's Singles

Men's Doubles

Women's Doubles

Mixed Doubles

Mixed Team Event
Chris Adcock, Carl Baxter, Anthony Clark, Rajiv Ouseph, Nathan Robertson, Mariana Agathangelou, Elizabeth Cann, Heather Olver, Jenny Wallwork, Gabrielle White.

Boxing

Team England consists of 9 boxers over 9 events. On 30 September 2010 it was announced that Khalid Yafai was withdrawing due to a shoulder injury and that Tommy Stubbs would move up a weight to replace him.

Men

Cycling

Team England consists of 18 cyclists over 18 events

On 23 September 2010, it was announced that Ian Stannard and Ben Swift were withdrawing due to health concerns (specifically around the dengue fever outbreak in Delhi).

On 25 September 2010, it was announced that Russell Downing was withdrawing from the road cycling team

Road
Men

Women

Track

Men

Women

Gymnastics

Team England consists of 13 gymnasts over 20 events

Artistic
Men

Women

Rhythmic
Women
Francesca Fox, Lynne Hutchison, Rachel Ennis

Hockey

Team England consists of 32 hockey players over the 2 team events.

Summary

Men
England Squad: 
James Fair, Richard Mantell, Richard Smith, Richard Alexander, Alastair Wilson, Adam Dixon, Glenn Kirkham, Ashley Jackson, Robert Moore, Harry Martin, James Tindall, Barry Middleton, Iain Mackay, Nicholas Catlin, Alastair Brogdon, Simon Mantell.

Pool B

Semi Final

Bronze Medal Match

Women
England Squad: 
Ashleigh Ball, Charlotte Craddock, Crista Cullen, Alex Danson, Susie Gilbert, Hannah Macleod, Helen Richardson, Chloe Rogers, Natalie Seymour, Beth Storry, Georgie Twigg, Laura Unsworth, Kate Walsh, Sally Walton, Nicola White, Kerry Williams.

Pool B

Semi Final

Bronze Medal Match

Lawn bowls

Team England consists of 12 lawn bowls players over 6 events

 indicates match winner after a tie-break

Netball

Team England consists of 12 netball players

Summary

Women
Karen Atkinson, Sonia Mkoloma, Pamela Cookey, Sara Bayman, Eboni Beckford Chambers, Louisa Brownfield, Jade Clarke, Rachel Dunn, Stacey Francis, Joanne Harten, Tamsin Greenway, Geva Mentor

Pool B

Semi Final

Rugby sevens

Summary

Men
England Squad: 
Greg Barden, Kevin Barrett, John Brake, Dan Caprice, Chris Cracknell, Isoa Damudamu,
Ben Gollings, Simon Hunt, Dan Norton, Tom Powell, James Rodwell, Mathew Turner.

Group D

Quarter Final

Semi Final

Bronze Medal Match

See also
 England at the Commonwealth Games
 England at the 2006 Commonwealth Games

References

External links
 Commonwealth Games England – Official website
 Commonwealth Games Info System – Official website

2010
Nations at the 2010 Commonwealth Games
Commonwealth Games